CSM Bacău may refer to:

 CSM Bacău (football), a men's football club in Bacău, Romania
 CSM Bacău (men's handball), a men's handball club in Bacău, Romania
 CS Știința Bacău (women's volleyball), a women's handball club in Bacău, Romania